The Quiet Hype is the electropop duo Jupiter Rising's third studio album and was released on March 17, 2009, and is what they call their beat heavy dance album by Seventeen magazine.

Background
The album features an eclectic mix of electro/dance pop, soulful ballads and even the occasional stab at social commentary. The influences vary from pop, rock and hip-hop to dance, electropop, and techno dressed in heavy drums, synths, and guitars. This album differs slightly from their earlier albums, Electropop and Jupiter Rising musically using more spacy synths and live instruments featured on songs like Falling Away, L.A. Girls, and Tres Cool.
The inspiration behind album for Spencer "was everything that I wanted to get out and do . Even before it was my project there used to be like six people in this band, and prior to that we all had an idea of where we wanted to go and that somewhere got lost in between pre-production and actually making the record. What we ended up with wasn’t necessarily what I wanted to create but I happened to be the one to own up to it." The sound of this new album is rooted in programmed-electro, but using live instruments on it. "It's live and raw", the band says, "but also a little futuristic with synthesizers. We've been tracking live drums on almost every song and tracking guitars on almost every song, and playing piano and keyboards, but also doing programs with synthesizers and soft synths, and tricks with vocodors and vocals." “We’re making a fresh and electric album with lots of great tracks like “Fallin’ Away,” “Tres Cool” and a shout out to our home LA with ‘LA Girl,’ explains Payo.  Guest musicians on new album include: Brent Paschke (guitar); Mike Shapiro (Drums) and Mike Garcon (Keyboards).

Track listing

Promotion
The album had been promoted by the Tres Cool E.P. and the single "Falling Away" released February 10. The group confirmed tracks, release date, and cover art on their website and MySpace page. Some songs from the album have been played on MTV's The Hills and other shows on MTV. They have also released some songs to the Internet. L.A. Girls/Tres Cool was released everywhere to digital music stores on December 16, 2008.

Credits
Robbie Angelucci – Guitar  
Jorge Costa – Engineer  
Mike Garson – Piano  
Peter Mokran – Mixing  
Spencer Nezey – Arranger, Producer, Instrumentation  
Greg Ogan – Arranger, Vocals (background), Producer, Engineer, Mixing, Instrumentation  
Brent Paschke – Guitar  
Brian Porizek – Art Direction, Design  
Mike Shapiro – Drums  
Ruslan Sirota – Keyboards  
Marc Tanner – Executive Producer  
Doug Tyo – Engineer, Assistant Engineer  
Eric Weaver – Mixing Assistant

References

External links
 Official website

2009 albums
Jupiter Rising albums